The Turkish Women's Volleyball Super Cup, is the Super Cup competition for professional women's volleyball in Turkey, organized by the Turkish Volleyball Federation since 2009. It is contested between the winners of the Turkish Volleyball League and the Turkish Cup.

The most successful teams of the competition so far are Fenerbahçe and Vakıfbank with three wins each. Currently Eczacıbaşı VitrA, with five wins as of 2020 are in the lead.

Finals

Source:

Performance by club

MVP by Edition 
 2014 - 
 2015 - 
 2017 - 
 2018 - 
 2019 - 
 2020 - 
 2021 - 
 2022 -

See also
Turkish Men's Volleyball League
Turkish Men's Volleyball Cup
Turkish Men's Volleyball Super Cup
Turkish Women's Volleyball League
Turkish Women's Volleyball Cup
Turkish Women's Volleyball Super Cup

References

External links
Turkish Volleyball Federastion official web page

Volleyball competitions in Turkey
Women's volleyball in Turkey
Recurring sporting events established in 2009
2009 establishments in Turkey